ActiveSync is a mobile data synchronization app developed by Microsoft, originally released in 1996. It synchronizes data with handheld devices and desktop computers. In the Windows Task Manager, the associated process is called wcescomm.exe.

Overview
ActiveSync allows a mobile device to be synchronized with either a desktop PC or a server running a compatible software product.

On desktops, ActiveSync synchronizes emails, calendar, contacts and tasks with Microsoft Outlook, along with Internet bookmarks and files. ActiveSync does not support all features of Outlook. For instance, contacts grouped into subfolders are not transferred. Only the contacts which are not in a subfolder are synchronized. In case of Exchange Server, only emails, calendar, contacts and tasks may be synchronized.

ActiveSync also provides for the manual transfer of files to a mobile device, along with limited backup functionality, and the ability to install and uninstall mobile device applications.

Supported mobile devices include PDAs or smartphones running Windows Mobile, Windows CE, BlackBerry 10 or iOS but not the older BlackBerry versions, Palm OS and Symbian platforms. Windows Phone 7 doesn't support desktop ActiveSync synchronization.

Starting with Windows Vista, ActiveSync has been replaced with the Windows Mobile Device Center, which is included as part of the operating system.

Release history

See also 

Software
Handheld PC Explorer
SyncToy
Windows Mobile Device Center
Devices
Handheld PC
Palm-size PC
Pocket PC
Smartphone
Concepts
Push email
Protocols
Exchange ActiveSync

References

External links
 Microsoft Exchange ActiveSync
 Microsoft ActiveSync

Discontinued Microsoft software
Data synchronization
Windows Mobile
Discontinued Windows components